Elizabeth Acevedo is a Dominican-American poet and author. In September 2022, the Poetry Foundation named her the year's Young People’s Poet Laureate.

Acevedo is the author of the young adult novels The Poet X, With the Fire on High, and Clap When You Land. The Poet X is a New York Times Bestseller, National Book Award Winner, and Carnegie Medal winner. She is also the winner of the 2019 Michael L. Printz Award, the 2018 Pura Belpre Award, and the Boston-Globe Hornbook Award Prize for Best Children’s Fiction of 2018. She lives in Washington, DC.

Early life and education 
Acevedo was born of Dominican immigrants and raised in Harlem, New York. She is the youngest child and only daughter. 
By the age of 12, Acevedo decided she wanted to be a rapper, but then realized what she really wanted to do was perform poetry. She then attended the Beacon School, where she met English teacher Abby Lublin. Lublin recruited Acevedo to join her after-school poetry club to further improve her work. At the age of 14, Acevedo competed in her first poetry slam at the Nuyorican Poets Café, and then participated in open mics around the city, in venues including Bowery Poetry Club and Urban Word NYC. She earned a Bachelor of Arts in Performing Arts at George Washington University by designing her own degree using courses in performing arts, English, and Sociology. She then earned an M.F.A. in Creative Writing at the University of Maryland and served as an adjunct professor for bachelor level creative writing courses.

Acevedo taught eighth grade in Prince George's County, Maryland. While coaxing a student to read more, the student said she wasn't reading because "These books aren't about us.’’ Acevedo realized her students were affected by the lack of diversity in their books and not by their capabilities. She then bought books that her students could relate to, and realized that she had the power to write such books too.

Career 
Following graduation from George Washington University, Acevedo went into the classroom as a 2010 Teach for America Corps participant. She continued on to teach eighth grade English in Prince George’s County, Maryland. Although the school's population was 78 percent Latino and 20 percent black, she was the first Latino teacher to teach a core subject.

She is a previous National Slam Champion, as well as former head coach for the D.C. Youth Slam Team. She has performed at Lincoln Center, Madison Square Garden, the Kennedy Center of the Performing Arts, South Africa’s State Theatre, Bozar in Brussels, and the National Library of Kosovo. She has also delivered several TED Talks, and her masterful poetry videos have been featured in Latina Magazine, Cosmopolitan,the Huffington Post, and Upworthy.

She is also the author of three young adult novels. Beastgirl and Other Origin Myths was published in 2016 and was a finalist for YesYes Chapbook Prize. Her first novel, The Poet X, was published in 2018. With the Fire on High is Acevedo's third novel, released in May 2019. Her fourth, Clap When You Land, was published in May 2020. It is about two sisters who grow up unaware of each other while living in different countries, but learn of each other after their father dies. The book was a Boston Globe-Horn Book Honor Book.

Acevedo is both a CantoMundo fellow and Cave Canem fellow. Her poems have appeared or are forthcoming from Poetry, Puerto Del Sol, Callaloo, and The Notre Dame Review, among others.

She also works as a visiting instructor at an adjudicated youth center in Washington, DC, where she works with incarcerated women and with teenagers.

Personal life
Acevedo identifies as Afro-Latina. Although raised Catholic, she no longer practices the religion. Currently, she lives in Washington, D.C. with her husband, Shakir Cannon-Moye. Acevedo grew up in a conservative and devout household of Catholicism. She went to church every Sunday with her mother and participated in every sacrament.  Acevedo does not practice Catholicism anymore, but still considers her relationship with her religion to be developing.  She questions the teaching of religion; her book With the Fire on High is influenced by the fact that religion is empowering but "sometimes makes women and young girls question their selves."

Critical response

The Poet X 

The Poet X is a New York Times Bestseller. The book highlights the struggles of growing up as a Latina girl dealing with her sexuality and religion, and finding her own voice. Kirkus Reviews describes Poet X as "Poignant and real; beautiful and intense".

Cleyvis Natera's review of Poet X for Aster(ix) Journal relates to the main character, Xiomara. Natera writes that Poet X is relatable to teenage girls dealing with their first love and strict parents that just don't understand,  and who are finding themselves or growing into the person that they’re meant to be. She urges its readers to buy the book.

The Poet X received the following accolades:

 2019: American Library Association's (ALA) top ten Amazing Audiobooks for Young Adults 
 2019: ALA's top ten Best Fiction for Young Adults
 2019: Michael L. Printz Award
 2019: Pura Belpre Award
 2019: Odyssey Award for Excellence in Audiobook Production
 2019: Golden Kite Honor Book for Young Adult Fiction
 2019: The Amelia Bloomer Book List
 2019: Walter Dean Myers Award for Outstanding Children’s Literature
 2018: Boston Globe Horn Book Award
 2018 National Book Award for Young People's Literature 
 2018: Kirkus Prize finalist

With the Fire on High 

With the Fire on High received the following accolades:

 2020: ALA's top ten Amazing Audiobooks for Young Adults
 2020: ALA's top ten Best Fiction for Young Adults
 2020: Amelia Bloomer Book List
 2020: Audie Award for Narration by the Author or Authors
 2020: Award Award Nominee for Young Adult
 2019: Goodreads Choice Awards Nominee for Young Adult Fiction
 Golden Kite Honor Book

Clap When You Land 

Clap When You Land is a New York Times and Indiebound bestseller. It also received "a standing ovation" from Kirkus Reviews. 

Clap When You Land received the following accolades:

 2021 Carnegie Medal Nominee for Shortlist
 2021 Odyssey Honor Audiobook
 2021 American Library Association's (ALA) Top Ten Best Fiction for Young Adults
 2021 ALA's Top Ten Amazing Audiobooks for Young Adults
 2021 Association for Library Services to Children (ALSC) Notable Children's Recording
 2021 Audie Award for Multi-Voiced Performance
 2021 Audie Award for Young Adult
 2020 Goodreads Choice Awards winner for Young Adult Fiction
 2020 Booklist Top of the List for Youth Audio
 2020 Kirkus Prize Finalist

Bibliography

As writer

Young adult novels 

 Beastgirl and Other Origin Myths (YesYes Books, 2016) , 
 The Poet X (HarperTeen, 2018) , 
 With the Fire on High (HarperTeen, 2019) , 
 Clap When You Land  (Quill Tree Books, 2020)

In anthologies 

 Beastgirl and Other Origin Myths (YesYes Books, 2016)
 Because I Was A Girl: True Stories for Girls of All Ages (Henry Holt, 2017) (with stories by Victoria Aveyard, Libba Bray, Melissa de la Cruz, Quvenzhané Wallis, Francesca Zambello)
 Women of Resistance: Poems for a New Feminism (OR Books, 2018) (with stories by Danielle Barnhart, Iris Mahan, Ryka Aoki, Rosebud Ben-Ori, Safia Elhillo, Jade Lascelles)
 Ink Knows No Borders (Seven Stories, 2019) (with poems by Samira Ahmed, Erika L. Sánchez, Ocean Vuong, Fatimah Asghar, Chen Chen, Ada Limón, Kaveh Akbar, Hala Alyan, Safia Elhillo, Jenny Xie, and Bao Phi)
Woke: A Young Poet's Call to Justice (Roaring Brook Press, 2020) (with poems by Mahogany L. Browne and Olivia Gatwood)

As audiobook narrator 

 The Poet X by Elizabeth Acevedo (HarperTeen, 2018) 
 Pride by Ibi Zoboi (Balzer+Bray, 2018)
 With the Fire on High by Elizabeth Acevedo (HarperTeen, 2019)
 Clap When You Land by Elizabeth Acevedo (HarperTeen, 2020)

See also 

CantoMundo Fellows
Cave Canem Fellow
Latino poetry

References

External links 

 Women of the World Poetry Slam 2016-- Elizabeth Acevedo "Hair"

Living people
21st-century American novelists
21st-century American poets
21st-century American women writers
American women novelists
American women poets
American writers of Dominican Republic descent
Carnegie Medal in Literature winners
George Washington University alumni
Michael L. Printz Award winners
National Book Award winners
Novelists from Maryland
Novelists from New York (state)
People from Prince George's County, Maryland
Poets from Maryland
Poets from New York (state)
Teach For America alumni
University of Maryland, College Park alumni
Year of birth missing (living people)